Isometroides angusticaudus, also known as the slender spider-hunting scorpion, is a species of scorpion in the Buthidae family. It is native to Australia, and was first described by German arachnologist Eugen von Keyserling in 1885.

Description
This species grows to about 30 mm in length, smaller than the otherwise very similar I. vescus, with which it was once synonimised.

Distribution and habitat
The species has been recorded from South Australia, New South Wales and Victoria.

Behaviour
The scorpions are specialised nocturnal predators of trapdoor spiders, and are often found in the vacant burrows of their prey.

References

 

 
angusticaudus
Scorpions of Australia
Endemic fauna of Australia
Fauna of New South Wales
Fauna of South Australia
Fauna of Victoria (Australia)
Animals described in 1885
Taxa named by Eugen von Keyserling